Hawkins Homestead, also known as the Zachariah Hawkins Homestead, is a historic home located at 165 Christian Avenue in Stony Brook in Brookhaven Town, Suffolk County, New York. It was built originally about 1660 and is a saltbox-form dwelling.  It has two principal components: a mid-17th-century -story house to the west and a large mid-18th-century (c. 1720 and 1750) and early-19th-century (c. 1812) -story addition to the east.

It was added to the National Register of Historic Places in 1988. It is south-west of the Bethel–Christian Avenue–Laurel Hill Historical District at 165 Christian Ave.

References

Houses on the National Register of Historic Places in New York (state)
Houses in Suffolk County, New York
National Register of Historic Places in Suffolk County, New York